Kuryanovskaya is a rural locality (a village) in Dvinitskoye Rural Settlement, Syamzhensky District, Vologda Oblast, Russia. The population was 15 as of 2002.

Geography 
Kuryanovskaya is located 45 km northeast of Syamzha (the district's administrative centre) by road. Ignashevskaya is the nearest rural locality.

References 

Rural localities in Syamzhensky District